The Angola forest tree frog (Leptopelis cynnamomeus), is a species of frog in the family Arthroleptidae found in an area from southern Democratic Republic of the Congo and north-western Zambia to central Angola. It is a common frog found in gallery forests, dry forests and well-wooded humid savanna.

References

Leptopelis
Frogs of Africa
Amphibians of Angola
Amphibians of the Democratic Republic of the Congo
Amphibians of Zambia
Taxa named by José Vicente Barbosa du Bocage
Amphibians described in 1893
Taxonomy articles created by Polbot